Gilmore and Gillmore are surnames with several origins and meanings.

The name can be of Irish, in particular from Ulster, and Scottish Highland origin, Anglicised from the Gaelic Mac Gille Mhoire (Scottish Gaelic), Mac Giolla Mhuire (Ulster Irish Gaelic). The name was a patronymic name meaning "servant of (the Virgin) Mary". 

Gilmore is an alternative, or sept, of Clan Morrison from Scotland, known as MacGilleMhoire in Scottish Gaelic.  Gillmore has been noted as a derivative of the Scottish Gaelic Gille-mohr, meaning "great servant", a name given to the armour-bearer to a Highland chief, or more prosaically to the servant or henchman of a chief.

Another origin of the surname Gilmore is Irish, with two separate meanings. In County Armagh, the name is an Anglicised form of Mac Giolla Mhura "servant of St. Mura" (of Fahan, County Donegal). In County Sligo, Gilmore is an Anglicisation of Mac Giolla Mhir meaning "son of the spirited lad".

People surnamed Gilmore or Gillmore
Aaron Gilmore (born 1973), New Zealand MP elected in 2008
Ada Gilmore (1883–1955), American watercolorist and printmaker
Alan C. Gilmore, New Zealand astronomer
Alexander Gilmore Cochran (1846–1928), American politician
Alexie Gilmore (born 1976), American actress
Alfred Gilmore (1812–1858), American politician
Art Gilmore (1912–2010), American voice actor
Artis Gilmore (born 1949), former American basketball player
Bernard Gilmore (1937–2013), American composer
Bob Gilmore (born 1961), Northern Irish musicologist
Boyd Gilmore (1905 or 1910–1976), American Delta blues singer, guitarist and songwriter
Brenda Gilmore, American politician
Brian Gilmore (1933–1959), Australian rules footballer
Bryan Gilmore (born 1978), American footballer
Charles W. Gilmore (1874–1945), American paleontologist
Craig Gilmore (born 1968), American actor
Daniel Gilmore (born 1983), former Australian rules footballer
David Gilmore (born 1964), American jazz guitarist
David Gillmore (1934–1999), British diplomat
Eamon Gilmore (born 1955), Irish politician
Edward Gilmore (1867–1924), American politician
E. Grover Gilmore (baseball) born Edward Grover Gilmore (1888–1919), American baseball player
Elka Gilmore (1960–2019), American chef
Eugene Allen Gilmore (1871–1953), American lawyer, diplomat and politician
Florence Magruder Gilmore (1881-1945), American author
Frederick Gilmore (1887–1969), American professional boxer
Gail Gilmore (1937–2014), Canadian actress and dancer
Gary Gilmore (1940–1977), American murderer
Gary Gilmore (baseball), American baseball coach
George Gilmore (1898–1995), IRA leader
Glen Gilmore (polo player), Australian polo player
Glenda Gilmore, American historian
Grant Gilmore (1910–1982), American law professor
Greg Gilmore (born 1962), American musician
Grover C. Gilmore (born 1950), American psychologist
Harold LeBruce Gilmore (1912–1996), American politician
Helen Gilmore (1900–1947), American actress
Howard W. Gilmore (1902–1943), US Navy submarine commander and Medal of Honor recipient
Ian Gilmore (born 1947), British professor of hepatology
Inez Haynes Gillmore (1873–1970), an American feminist author, also known as Inez Haynes Irwin 
Jared S. Gilmore (born 2000), American child actor
Jennifer Gilmore (born 1970), American novelist
Jim Gilmore (born 1949), American politician
Jimmie Dale Gilmore (born 1945), American country singer
Joe Gilmore (born 1922), One of the longest running Head Barmen at The Savoy Hotel's American Bar.
Joey Gilmore (born 1944), American electric blues and soul blues singer
John Gilmore (disambiguation) various people including:

Joseph A. Gilmore (1811–1867), American railroad superintendent
Julianna Gilmore, birth name of Christian singer Julianna Zobrist
June Gilmore (1922–1980), All-American Girls Professional Baseball League player
Len Gilmore (born 1917), former American baseball player
Lyman Gilmore (1874–1951), American aviation pioneer
Margalo Gillmore (1897–1986), English-born American actress
Margaret Gilmore (born 1956), British journalist
Marion Gilmore (1909–1984), American artist
Martha Gilmore, (b, 1980), American planetary geologist
Marshall Gilmore (born 1831), American Methodist bishop
Dame Mary Gilmore (1865–1962), Australian poet and journalist
Matthew Gilmore (born 1972), Belgian-Australian track cyclist
Mikal Gilmore (born 1951), American music journalist
Patrick Gilmore (actor) (born 1976), Canadian actor
Patrick Gilmore (1829–1892), Irish-born American composer and bandmaster
Peter Gilmore (1931–2013), British actor
Peter H. Gilmore (born 1958), American author; administrator of the Church of Satan
Quincy Adams Gillmore (1825–1888), American author, civil engineer and Union Army general during the American Civil War
Rachna Gilmore (born 1953), Canadian children's writer
Rebecca Gilmore (born 1979), Australian diver
Richie Gilmore (c. 1966), American motorsport vice-president
Rochelle Gilmore (born 1981), Australian racing cyclist
Samuel Louis Gilmore (1859–1910), American politician
Scott Gilmore (born 1971), Social Entrepreneur
Stephon Gilmore, American football player with the NFL's New England Patriots
Steve Gilmore, Australian Naval Officer
Stuart Gilmore (1909–1971), American film editor
Susan Gilmore (born 1954), English actress
Ted Gilmore (born 1967), American football coach
Thea Gilmore (born 1979), British singer/songwriter
Tom Gilmore (disambiguation) various people including:

Vanessa Gilmore (born 1956), U.S. judge
Virginia Gilmore (1919–1986), American actress
Voit Gilmore (1918–2005), American politician
William Gilmore (disambiguation) various people including:

William Gilmore Simms (1806–1870), American poet, novelist and historian

Fictional characters
Jim Gilmore, protagonist of Ernest Hemingway's early short story "Up In Michigan," written in 1921 and revised in 1938.
Hugh Gilmore, alter ego alias of pulp magazine character Jethro Dumont as The Green Lama
Lorelai Gilmore and Rory Gilmore, mother-and-daughter protagonists of the comedy-drama Gilmore Girls
Emily Gilmore, Lorelai's mother and Rory's grandmother from the same series. Richard Gilmore, Lorelai's father and Rory's grandfather.
Happy Gilmore, the title character of the Adam Sandler movie, Happy Gilmore.
Shaun Gilmore, a recurring character in the first season of Critical Role, a powerful sorcerer and ally of Vox Machina who runs Gilmore's Glorious Goods, a store selling magical items and artifacts.
Hannah Gilmore, a character in the British soap opera, Coronation Street

References

See also
Gillmor
Morrison
Clan Morrison
Gilmor
Gilmore (disambiguation)
Gilmour (surname)
Gilmer (surname)
Dùn Èistean
Gilmore Girls

Anglicised Scottish Gaelic-language surnames
Surnames of Ulster-Scottish origin
Scottish surnames

Morrison